Asara may refer to:

 Asara, a town in Iran
 Asara Rural District
 Asara District
 Asara, India, a village in Uttar Pradesh, India
 Asara, a river cruise ship involved in a COVID-19 outbreak on the Nile River in Egypt, see 2020 coronavirus outbreak on cruise ships

See also

 
 
 Aasara
 Aasra
 ASRA (disambiguation)
 Azara (disambiguation)